Michael Thompson may refer to:

Arts and entertainment
 Michael Thompson (guitarist) (born 1954), American guitarist and songwriter
 Michael Thompson (horn player) (born 1954), British brass musician
 Michel Thompson (1921–2007), French painter
 Michael Thompson (photographer), American photographer
 Michael Thompson, American musician and touring member of the Eagles
 Doc Thompson (1969–2019), American talk radio host

Politics
 Michael Thompson (Canadian politician) (first elected 2003), city Councillor in Toronto
 Michael C. Thompson, Oklahoma state cabinet member
 Mike Thompson (California politician) (born 1951), United States Representative
 Mike Thompson (Kansas politician) (born 1957), state senator
 Mike Thompson (Oklahoma politician) (born 1976), state Representative
 Mike Thompson (Mississippi politician) (born 1976), state senator

Sports

Basketball
 Michael Thompson (basketball) (born 1989), American professional basketball player who has played overseas
 Mychal Thompson (born 1955), Bahamian sports announcer and former longtime NBA basketball player
 Mychel Thompson (born 1988), American basketball player who was briefly in the NBA

Other sports
 Michael Thompson (American football) (born 1977), former offensive tackle
 Michael Thompson (golfer) (born 1985), American golfer
 Michael Thompson (lacrosse) (born 1976), box lacrosse player
 Michael Thompson (karateka) (born 1962), English karateka and kickboxer
 Michael Thompson (sport shooter) (born 1956), American sports shooter
 Mike Thompson (2000s pitcher) (born 1980), Major League Baseball pitcher
 Mike Thompson (1970s pitcher) (born 1949), Major League Baseball pitcher
 Mike Thompson (American football) (born 1971), former defensive tackle
 Mickey Thompson (1928–1988), American off-road racer
 Mike Thompson (umpire) (fl. early 20th century), American football referee and baseball umpire

Other
 Michael Thompson (academic) (born 1931), British academic
 J. Michael T. Thompson (born 1937), British applied mathematician
 Michael S. Thompson (born 1948), beekeeper in Chicago
 Mike Thompson (Falling Skies), television character

See also
 Michael Thomson (disambiguation)